Waizenkirchen is a municipality in the district of Grieskirchen in the Austrian state of Upper Austria.

Geography 
Waizenkirchen lies in the Hausruckviertel. About 10 percent of the municipality is forest, and 80 percent is farmland.

History 
On May 4, 1945, when a parked tank at the 1st Battalion Command Post caught fire, putting nearby vehicles at risk from flames and exploding ammunition, Technician 5th Grade Eugene B. Spade from Major General Stanley Eric Reinhart's 261st Infantry Regiment raced through bursting 90-mm shells and .50 caliber cartridges to prevent a disaster.

References 

Cities and towns in Grieskirchen District